This article lists the results and fixtures for the Egypt women's national football team.

The Cleopatra's first activity was in 1993, when they played a Unofficial Friendly against Russia in which they lost 17 to nil.
After some development, the Cleopatra's made their official debut in the 1998 African Women's Championship after beating Uganda in the qualifying round. however, They lost all 3 matches scoring only 2 goals in three matches. the team saw visible improvement as they beat Ivory Coast and Kenya. Egypt is currently ranked 93rd in the FIFA Women's World Rankings. Since its return to the international stage the Egyptian team played several Friendlies three out of four were against Jordan.

Record per opponent
Key

The following table shows Bahrain' all-time official international record per opponent:

Last updated: Egypt vs Jordan, 10 October 2022.

Results

1998

2000

2005

2006

2009

2010

2011

2012

2014

2015

2016

2021

2022

See also
Egypt national football team results

References

External links
 Egypt results on The Roon Ba
 Egypt results on Globalsports
 Egypt results on worldfootball.net
 Egypt results on Xscores

2000s in Egypt
2010s in Egypt
2020s in Egypt
Women's national association football team results